The Pacific gopher snake (Pituophis catenifer catenifer) is a subspecies of large non-venomous colubrid snake native to the western coast of North America.

Description 

 

Pacific gopher snake adults range in size from 3–7 feet (91–213  centimeters) in total length. However, most of the subspecies reach a length of 4–5 feet (122–152 cm). The hatchlings are relatively long, and they have been recorded at lengths upward of 20 inches (51 cm).

The Pacific gopher snake has a base color ranging from yellow to dark brown and has a gray coloring on the sides of the body. It is a spotted snake, with the spots being dark brown. Usually there are 41 to 99 spots on the body, while the tail spots range from 14 to 33. The side of the body has 2 or 3 rows of alternating black and brown spots.

A snake with keeled scales, and a narrow head that is wider than the neck, the Pacific gopher snake also displays a protruding rostral scale on the tip of the snout. The two most common base colors are straw and straw gray, though the species' color varies widely. The dorsal blotches, or saddles, are well-defined and generally dark to chocolate brown, though some specimens have had black blotches. The side blotches are often brown or gray. The back of the neck is dark brown. In many areas, such as Solano County, California, the snake can be found in a striped morph.

The ventral side may be cream-colored to yellowish with dark spots. On the dorsal side, especially near the tail, there is often a reddish coloration.

Identification 

As aforementioned, there are two to three rows of spots on the side of the Pacific gopher snake. However, the San Diego gopher snake (P. c. annectens) has three to four rows of smaller spots on its side.  The Pacific gopher snake's saddle spots do not have the barren characteristic as those of the San Diego gopher snakes do. Also, the spots in the second row of spots are much larger on P. c. catenifer as compared to P. c. annectens. Finally, the Pacific gopher snake generally has more saddle spots than the San Diego gopher snake.

Behavior 
The snake is diurnal, though sometimes active at dusk and nocturnal during warm weather. They prefer drier habitats such as meadows, fields and agricultural farmland, and are seldom found in dense forests.

Like other gopher snakes, the Pacific gopher snake can produce a loud hiss when agitated or fearful. When threatened, this species will inflate its body, flatten its head, and vigorously shake its tail, which may produce a rattling sound if done in dry vegetation. However, gopher snakes are nonvenomous, generally good natured, and not harmful to humans.

The Pacific gopher snake is carnivorous. Their diet consists of small mammals, notably pocket gophers; birds and their eggs; the occasional lizard and insect, and even bats.

Life expectancy 

The Pacific gopher snake is observed to live 12 to 15 years in the wild. The oldest known individual lived over 33 years in captivity.

Reproduction 

They are an oviparous species in which eggs are laid from June to August and hatch in 2 to 2.5 months.

In captive breeding, the snake goes through a winter brumation period to improve breeding success. The clutches average 1214 eggs and hatch in the same time period as in the wild.

Geographic range 

The Pacific gopher snake ranges up and down the West Coast of the United States, its range ending in the southern coast of California. Gopher snakes are rarely seen above  and are most commonly seen adjacent to farms in semi-arid brushy areas. The Pacific gopher snake can also be found in southern British Columbia and Alberta, and in Mexico.

References

External links

Pituophis
Snakes of North America
Reptiles of the United States
Fauna of the California chaparral and woodlands
Fauna of the San Francisco Bay Area
Natural history of the California Coast Ranges
Natural history of the Transverse Ranges
Taxa named by Henri Marie Ducrotay de Blainville